Dorothea of Saxe-Coburg and Gotha (Dorothea Maria Henriette Auguste Louise; 30 April 1881 – 21 January 1967) was a princess of Saxe-Coburg and Gotha by birth and the Duchess of Schleswig-Holsteinthrough her marriage to Ernst Gunther, duke of Schleswig-Holstein. Dorothea was born in Vienna, Austria, the second child and only daughter of Prince Philipp of Saxe-Coburg and Gotha and Princess Louise of Belgium.

Marriage and children
Dorothea married Ernst Gunther, Duke of Schleswig-Holstein, fifth child and third-eldest son of Frederick VIII, Duke of Schleswig-Holstein and his wife Princess Adelheid of Hohenlohe-Langenburg, on 2 August 1898 in Coburg, Duchy of Saxe-Coburg and Gotha.

Dorothea and Ernst Gunther had no children. In 1920, they adopted Princess Marie Luise (1908–1969) and Prince Johann Georg of Schleswig-Holstein-Sonderburg-Glücksburg (1911–1941), son and daughter of Prince Albrecht of Schleswig-Holstein-Sonderburg-Glücksburg and his wife Countess Ortrud of Ysenburg und Büdingen. Marie Luise and Johann Georg were grandchildren of Friedrich, Duke of Schleswig-Holstein-Sonderburg-Glücksburg, an older brother of Christian IX of Denmark.

Dorothea died at Schloss Taxis, Dischingen, Baden-Württemberg, Germany, aged 85.

Ancestry

References

Sources
 La fortune de Dora. Une petite-fille de Léopold II chez les nazis (Olivier Defrance & Joseph van Loon, Racine, Brussels), 2013

External link

1881 births
1967 deaths
Nobility from Vienna
Dorothea
Dorothea
Dorothea